Early New Zealand Books (ENZB) is a project from the library of the University of Auckland, New Zealand, launched in 2005, that aims at providing keyword-searchable text of significant books published about New Zealand in the first two-thirds of the nineteenth century. It also includes the subsequently published memoirs, journals and correspondence of people active in this era. The project has been funded and managed by the University of Auckland Library and is freely available on the internet.

Each page is linked to an image of that page from the original book. This provides researchers with assurance of accuracy. There are special searches for captions to illustrations and chapter summaries as well as a general full-text search across the whole corpus. The images are available at original size and extra-large. Books are also available as downloadable ePub ebooks. It is one of a number of projects at the University of Auckland library that use the b-engine rendering engine. In February 2015 three hundred and twenty-seven volumes have been digitized. Twenty-seven were contributed by Auckland Libraries and twenty-four by the Auckland War Memorial Museum.

It is distinct from a similar collection of digitised older New Zealand publications, viz. the New Zealand Electronic Text Collection from Victoria University of Wellington. 

It does not include the rarest early New Zealand book A History of the Birds of New Zealand by ornithologist Walter Buller and plates by the artist JG Keulemans.

List of books
Key works highlighted.
 1807 - Savage, John. Some Account Of New Zealand
 1817-1853 - The Missionary Register [Sections relating to New Zealand. Missing most of 1836-1843, 1848]
 1830, 1831, 1832, 1834, 1835, 1837, 1843, 1850, 1854, 1855 - Church Missionary Record [Sections relating to New Zealand only]
 1817 - Nicholas, J. L. Narrative of a Voyage to New Zealand [Vol.I]
 1817 - Nicholas, J. L. Narrative of a Voyage to New Zealand [Vol.II]
 1824 - Cruise, R. Journal of a Ten Months' Residence in New Zealand [2nd ed.][Capper  1974]
 1829 - Dillon, P. Narrative and Successful Result of a Voyage... Vol. I. [Selected chs.]
 1829 - Dillon, P. Narrative and Successful Result of a Voyage... Vol. II. [Selected chs.]
 1831 - Tyerman, D. Journal of Voyages and Travels... Vol. II. [One chapter]
 1832 - Busby, J. Authentic Information relative to New South Wales and New Zealand
 1832 - Earle, A. A Narrative of a Nine Months' Residence in New Zealand, in 1827
 1832 - Morrell, B. A narrative of Four Voyages... [Fourth Voyage, Chapters 2 and 3]
 1830 - Craik, George L. The New Zealanders
 1834 - MacDonell, Thomas. Extracts from Mr. M'Donnell's MS Journal
 1835 -  Yate, William. An Account Of New Zealand [2nd ed.]
 1836 - Report of the Formation and Establishment of the New Zealand Temperance Society
 1836 - Marshall, W. B. A Personal Narrative of Two Visits to New Zealand
 1838? - Description of a view of the Bay of Islands, New Zealand, and the surrounding country
 1838 - Beecham, J. Remarks Upon the Latest Official Documents Relating to New Zealand.
 1838 - Hinds, Samuel. The latest Official Documents relating to New Zealand
 1838 - Polack, J. S. New Zealand [Vol.I] [Capper reprint, 1974]
 1838 - Polack, J. S. New Zealand [Vol.II] [Capper reprint, 1974]
 1839 - Darwin, Charles. Journal of Researches into the Geology and Natural History of the Various Countries Visited by H.M.S. Beagle. [Chapter XX only] [ Brussels: Editions Culture et Civilisation, 1969]
 1839 - Fitzroy, R. Narrative of the Surveying Voyages of His Majesty's ships Adventure and Beagle [New Zealand chapters] [New York: AMS, 1966].
 1839 - Lang, John Dunmore. New Zealand in 1839: or Four Letters to the Right Hon. Earl Durham on the Colonization of that Island.
 1839 - Walton, John. Twelve Months Residence in New Zealand
 1839 - White, William. Important Information Relative to New Zealand
 1840 - Campbell, E. The Present State, Resources and Prospects of New Zealand
 1840 - Hawtrey, Montague J. G. An Earnest Address to New Zealand Colonists, with Reference to their Intercourse with the Native Inhabitants.
 1840 - Johnson, J. Pitts. Plain Truths, Told by a Traveller [New Zealand sections
 1840 - Missions of the Church Missionary Society at Kishnaghur and in New Zealand [New Zealand Section Only]
 1840 - Polack, J. S. Manners and Customs of the New Zealanders [Vol. I.] [Capper reprint, 1976]
 1840 - Polack, J. S. Manners and Customs of the New Zealanders [Capper reprint, 1976]
 1840 - Rudge, J. An Address to the New Zealand Emigrants]
 1840 - Ward J. Supplementary Information Relative to New Zealand
 1841 - Bidwill, J. Rambles in New Zealand [Capper facsimile, 1974]
 1841 - Bright, John. Handbook for Emigrants and Others
 1841 - Franklin, Jane. Letter from Lady Franklin to Sir John Franklin. Australian Historical Monographs New Series, Vol. 18, Part II, 1977
 1841 - Hodgskin, R. A Narrative of Eight Months' Sojourn in New Zealand
 1842 - Fox, William. Colonization and New Zealand
 1842 - Mangles, R. How to Colonise
 1842 - Petre, H. W. An Account of the Settlements of the New Zealand Company [5th ed.][Capper 1971]
 1842 - Ritter, Carl. Die Colonisation von Neu-Seeland
 1842 - Wade, William A Journey in the Northern Island of New Zealand
 1842 - Latest Information from the Settlement of New Plymouth
 1842 - Heaphy, C. Narrative of a Residence in Various Parts of New Zealand [Hocken 1970]
 1842 - Ward, J. Nelson, the Latest Settlement of the New Zealand Company
 1842 - Terry, Charles. New Zealand: its Advantages and Prospects as a British Colony
 1842 - Jameson, R. G. New Zealand, South Australia and New South Wales [Part]
 1843 - Chapman, H. The New Zealand Portfolio
 1843 - Letters from Settlers and Labouring Emigrants
 1843 - Dieffenbach, Ernest. Travels in New Zealand [Vol.I] [Capper reprint, 1974]
 1843 - Dieffenbach, Ernest. Travels in New Zealand [Vol.II] [Capper reprint, 1974]
 1843 - Jennings, J. New Zealand Colonization
 1843 - Russell, Michael. Polynesia; or an Historical Account of the Principal Islands in the South Sea [New Zealand Chapter Only]
 1843 -  Selwyn, George Augustus. New Zealand Mission: Views of the Bishop of New Zealand.
 1844 - Burns, Barnet. A Brief Narrative of a New Zealand Chief [Hocken Library facsim. 1970]
 1844 - Coates, D. The New Zealanders and their Lands
 1844 - Colenso, W. Excursion in the Northern Island of New Zealand
 1845 - Brodie, W. Remarks on the Past and Present State of New Zealand
 1845 - Churton, Henry. Letters from Wanganui, New Zealand
 1845 - Great Britain Parliament. House of Commons, A corrected report of the debate in the House of Commons
 1845 - Martin, S. M. New Zealand: in a Series of Letters
 1845 - Scheme of the Colony of the Free Church at Otago
 1845 - Wakefield, E.J. Adventure in New Zealand [Vol.I.]
 1845 - Wakefield, E. J. Adventure in New Zealand [Vol.II.]
 1845 - Wilkes, C. Narrative of the United States Exploring Expedition Vol. II. [Part only]
 1845 - Williams, W. Three Letters Addressed to the Right Hon. the Earl of Chichester Relative to the Charges Brought Against the New Zealand Mission
 1846 - Aborigines Protection Society. On the British Colonization of New Zealand.
 1846 - The Auckland Pocket Almanack for the Year 1847
 1846 - Fitzroy, Robert. Remarks on New Zealand: in February 1846
 1846 - Marjoribanks, A. Travels in New Zealand
 1847 - Angas, G. F. The New Zealanders [Reed facsim., 1966]
 1847 - Angas, G. F. Savage Life and Scenes in Australia and New Zealand [Vol I.]
 1847 - Angas, G. F. Savage Life and Scenes in Australia and New Zealand Vol.II
 1847 - Grimstone, S. E. The Southern Settlements of New Zealand.
 1847 - Plain Facts Relative to the Late War in the Northern District of New Zealand
 1847 - Ross, J. C. A Voyage of Discovery and Research in the Southern and Antarctic Regions [New Zealand Chapters Only].
 1847 - Selwyn, G. Annals of the Diocese of New Zealand
 1848 - An Account of the Earthquakes in New Zealand
 1847 - Selwyn, G. England and the New Zealanders, Part I
 1848 - Arrangements for the Adjustment of Questions Relating to Land in the Settlements of the New Zealand Company.
 1848 - Byrne, J. C. Twelve Years' Wanderings in the British Colonies [New Zealand sections]
 1848 - Chamerovzow, L. A. The New Zealand Question
 1848 - Correspondence Between the Wesleyan Missionary Committee and the Rt. Hon. Earl Grey
 1849 - Brees, S. C. Pictorial Illlustrations of New Zealand
 1849-1850, 1857 - Church Missionary Intelligencer [Sections relating to New Zealand]
 1849 - Fox, William. Report on the Settlement of Nelson in New Zealand
 1849 - Hursthouse, C. An Account of the Settlement of New Plymouth
 1849 - McKillop, H. F. Reminiscences of Twelve Months' in New Zealand [Fac. ed. Capper, 1973]
 1849 - Power, W. T. Sketches in New Zealand
 1850? - Brees, S. C. Guide and Description of the Panorama of New Zealand
 1850 - Mantell, G. A. Notice of the Remains of the Dinornis and Other Birds...
 1851 - Brown, William. New Zealand and its Aborigines [2nd ed.]
 1851 - Burton, J. H. The Emigrant's Manual. New Zealand, Cape of Good Hope and Port Natal [NZ sections only]
 1851 - Cooper, G. S. Journal of an Expedition Overland from Auckland to Taranaki
 1847-1851. Selwyn, G. A. New Zealand
 1851 - Fox, William. The Six Colonies of New Zealand
 1851 - Hursthouse, C. New Zealand: the Emigration Field of 1851.
 1851 - Lucett, E. Rovings in the Pacific, from 1837 to 1849 [New Zealand sections]
 1851 - Shortland, E. The Southern Districts of New Zealand: A Journal, with Passing Notices of the Customs of the Aborigines.
 1852 - Barrett, A. The Life of the Rev. John Hewgill Bumby
 1852 - Defoe, D. He Korero Tipuna Pakeha no Mua, ko Ropitini Kuruho tona Ingoa
 1852 - Gann, A. J. The New Zealand Emigration Circular for 1852
 1852 - Martin, A. Journal of an Emigrant from Dorsetshire to New Zealand. [Typescript]
 1852 - Mundy, G. C. Our Antipodes. [Vol. II.]
 1852 - Peppercorne, F. S. Geological and Topographical Sketches of the Province of New Ulster
 1852 - Rough, David. Narrative of a Journey through Part of the North of New Zealand
 1852 - Rules and Regulations of the Constabulary Force of New Zealand
 1852 - Shaw, John. A Tramp to the Diggings [New Zealand sections only]
 1853 - Adams, C. W. A Spring in the Canterbury Settlement
 1853 - Collinson, T. B. Remarks on the Military Operations in New Zealand
 1853 - Earp, G. B. New Zealand: Its Emigration and Gold Fields
 1853 - Grey, H. G. The Colonial Policy of Lord John Russell's Administration. [New Zealand chapters]
 1853 - New Zealand and its Six Colonies Historically and Geographically Described.
 1853 - Rochfort, J. The Adventures of a Surveyor in New Zealand... [Capper reprint, 1974]
 1853 - Swainson, William. Auckland, the Capital of New Zealand
 1854 - Cholmondeley, T. Ultima Thule
 1854 - Golder, W. The Pigeons' Parliament
 1854 - Grey, George. Memorandum upon a Letter addressed by Lord Lyttelton...
 1854 - Malone, R. E. Three Years' Cruise in the Australasian Colonies [NZ sections only]
 1854 - Richardson, J. The First Christian Martyr of the New Zealand Church
 1854 - Richardson, J. A Summer's Excursion in New Zealand
 1854 - Selfe, H. S. - The Accounts of the Canterbury Association, with Explanatory Remarks, in a Letter to Lord Lyttelton
 1854 - Young, Robert. The Southern World [New Zealand sections only]
 1855 - Davis, C. O. Maori Mementos...[and a] Collection of Laments...
 1855 - Davis, C. O. The Renowned Chief Kawiti and other New Zealand Warriors
 1855 - Taylor, Richard. Te Ika a Maui
 1855 - Tucker,  S. The Southern Cross and Southern Crown
 1856 - Brown, A. N. Brief Memorials of an Only Son [2nd ed.]
 1856 - Busby, J. The First Settlers in New Zealand and their Treatment by the Government
 1856 - Fitton, Edward. New Zealand: its Present Condition, Prospects and Resources
 1856 - New Zealand Pilot
 1856 - The New Zealand Church Almanac, for the Year of Our Lord 1856
 1856 - Shortland, Edward. Traditions and Superstitions of the New Zealanders
 1856 - White, J. Maori Superstitions
 1857 - Askew, J. A Voyage to Australia and New Zealand [New Zealand sections]
 1857 - Baker, A. New Zealand compared with Great Britain in its Physical and Social Aspects
 1857 - Busby, James. Colonies and Colonization.
 1857 - Busby, James. A letter to His Excellency Colonel Thomas Gore Browne
 1857 - Cooper, I. R. The New Zealand Settler's Guide
 1857 - DEwes, J. China, Australia and the Pacific Islands in the Years, 1855-56. [Chap VII only]
 1857 - Domestic Scenes in New Zealand. [First ed. was 1845]
 1857 - Hursthouse, C. New Zealand, or Zealandia, the Britain of the South [Vol.I.]
 1857 - Hursthouse, C. New Zealand, or Zealandia, the Britain of the South [Vol.II.]
 1857 - Nordhoff, C. Stories of the Island World [New Zealand chapter]
 1857 - Paul, R. B. Letters from Canterbury, New Zealand
 1858 - Moon, H. An Account of the Wreck of H.M. Sloop "Osprey"
 1858 - Puseley, Daniel. The Rise and Progress of Australia, Tasmania, and New Zealand. [New Zealand Chapters Only]
 [1858 - Smith, S. P. An 1858  Journey into the Interior [Published 1953]]
 1859 - Busby, J. The Pre-emption Land Question
 1859 - Fenton, F. D. Observations on the State of the Aboriginal Inhabitants of New Zealand
 1859 - Fuller, F. Five Years' Residence in New Zealand
 1859 - Swainson, William. New Zealand and its Colonization
 1859 - Thomson, A. S. The Story of New Zealand [Vol.I]
 1859 - Thomson, A. S. The Story of New Zealand [Vol.II]
 1859 - Willox, J. Willox's New Zealand Hand Book
 1859 - Wilson, E. Rambles at the Antipodes [Part only]
 1860 - Bell, F. D. Notes by the Governor on Sir William Martin's Pamphlet entitled The Taranaki Question
 1860 - Busby, J. Remarks upon a Pamphlet entitled 'The Taranaki Question...'
 1860 - Browne, E. H. The Case of the War in New Zealand
 1860 - Chapman's New Zealand Almanac
 1860 - Hadfield, O. One of England's Little Wars
 1860 - Johnston, A. Notes on Maori Matters.
 1860 - Voices from Auckland
 1860 - Weld, F. A. Hints to Intending Sheep-Farmers in New Zealand
 1861 - Bunbury, T. Reminiscences of a Veteran [New Zealand chapters]
 1861 - Church Missionary Society. Memorial to His Grace, The Secretary of State for the Colonies...
 1861 - Gilbert, T. New Zealand Settlers and Soldiers or The War in Taranaki
 1861 - Hadfield, O. A Sequel to 'One of England's Little Wars'
 1861 - Hadfield, O. The New Zealand War: the Second Year of one of England's Little Wars
 1861 - Hawtrey, M. Justice to New Zealand, Honour to England
 1861 - Martin, W. The Taranaki Question. 3rd ed.
 1862 - Grayling, W. I. The War in Taranaki, during the years 1860-1861
 1862 - Maning, F. E. History of the War in the North of New Zealand
 1862 - Marjouram, W. Memorials of Sergeant William Marjouram
 1862 - Swainson, W. New Zealand and the War
 1862 - Ward, R. Lectures from New Zealand
 1863 - Alexander, J. Incidents of the Maori War
 1863 - Butler, S. A First Year in Canterbury Settlement.
 1863 - Carey, R. Narrative of the Late War in New Zealand
 1863 - Heywood, B. A. A Vacation Tour at the Antipodes [Chapters 3-5 and Appendix and NZ Map]
 1863? - von Hochstetter, F. Hochstetter's Atlas.
 1863 - Hodder, Edwin. Memories of New Zealand Life. 2nd ed.
 1863 - Maning, Frederick. Old New Zealand
 1863 - Scherzer, K. Narrative of the Circumnavigation... by the Austrian Frigate, Novara [Ch. XIX]
 1863 - Settler. The Waikato and Ngaruawahia, the Proposed New Capital of New Zealand
 1863 - Stones, W. New Zealand, the Land of Promise, and its Resources
 1863 - Wakefield, E. J. What will they do in the General Assembly?
 1864 - Gorst, J.E. The Maori king
 1864 - von Hochstetter, Ferdinand. The Geology of New Zealand
 1864 - Muter, E. Travels and Adventures of an Officer's Wife in India, China and New Zealand. [NZ Sections only]
 1864 - Partridge, C. Calumny Refuted, the Colonists Vindicated...
 1864 - Sewell, H. The New Zealand Rebellion
 1864 - The New Zealand Government and the Maori War of 1863-64.
 1865 - Alexander, J. Notes on the Maories of New Zealand
 1865 - Davis, R. A Memoir of the Rev. Richard Davis
 1865 - Puna, Aterea. Letters on the Present State of Maori Affairs
 1865 - Shortland, E. A Short Sketch of the Maori Races.
 1866 - Angas, G. F. Polynesia [Selected chapters relating to NZ]
 1866 - Busby, J. Our Colonial Empire and the Case of New Zealand
 1866 - Carter, C. R. Life and Recollections of a New Zealand Colonist Vol. II . [New Zealand sections only]
 1866 - Fox, W. The War in New Zealand
 1866 - Hector, J. First General Report on the Coal Deposits of New Zealand
 1866 - Hunt, F. Twenty-five Years' Experience in New Zealand and the Chatham Islands
 1866 - Mitchell and Seffern's Directory of the City and Suburbs of Auckland, for 1866-7.
 1866 - The New Zealand Handbook (11th ed.)
 1867 - Cooper, T. A Digger's Diary at the Thames, 1867 [Hocken 1978]
 1867? - Hutton, F. W. Geological report on the Lower Waikato District
 1867? - Hutton, F. W. Geological Report on the Thames Gold Fields
 1867 - Moillet, J. K. The Mary Ira
 1867 - Taylor, R. Our Race and its Origin.
 1867 - Thomson, J. T. Rambles with a Philosopher
 1867? - Thomson, Mrs. Twelve Years in Canterbury New Zealand
 1867 - Williams, William. Christianity among the New Zealanders
 1867 - von Hochstetter, Ferdinand. New Zealand
 1868 - Hector, J. Abstract Report on the Progress of the Geological Survey of New Zealand during 1866-67
 1868 - The History of Local Government in New Zealand
 1868? - Hursthouse, C. 'New Zealand Wars': a Letter to the Times
 1868 - Liverpool, C. Foljambe, Earl of. Three Years on the Australian Station
 1868 - Richardson, J. L. C. Our Constitutional History
 1868 - The Thames Miners Guide
 1868 - Williams, T. C. New Zealand, the Manawatu Purchase Completed
 1869 - Bowden, T A. Manual of New Zealand Geography
 1869 - Hawthorne, J. A Dark Chapter from New Zealand History. [Capper reprint 1974]
 1869 - May, J. Guide to Farming in New Zealand.
 1869 - McDonnell, Thomas. An Explanation of the Principal Causes which led to the Present War on the West Coast of New Zealand.
 1869 - The Taranaki Almanac and Directory.
 1870 - Frere, A. The Antipodes and Round the World [New Zealand chapters]
 1870 - Grey, G. Polynesian Ethnology.
 1870 - Meade, H. A Ride through the Disturbed Districts of New Zealand. [Chapters I-VI].
 1870 - Strachan, A. The Life of the Rev Samuel Leigh
 1871 - Haast, J. von. Moas and Moa Hunters
 1871 - Money, C. L. Knocking About in New Zealand [Capper reprint, 1972]
 1872 - Turner, J. G. The Pioneer Missionary
 1872 - Ward, R. Life among the Maories of New Zealand
 1873 - Alexander, J. Bush Fighting
 1873 - Barker, M. A. Station Amusements in New Zealand.
 1873 - Kennedy, A. New Zealand
 1873 - The Province of Canterbury, New Zealand: Information for Intending Emigrants.
 1873 - St. John, J. H. A. Pakeha Rambles through Maori Lands
 1873 - Tinne, J. Ernest. The Wonderland of the Antipodes
 1873 - Trollope, Anthony. Australia and New Zealand [New Zealand Chapters Only]
 1874 - Adam, J. Twenty-five Years of Emigrant Life in the South of New Zealand
 1874 - Baines, W M. The Narrative of Edward Crewe, or Life in New Zealand
 1874 - Bathgate, A. Colonial Experiences or Sketches of People and Places in the Province of Otago, New Zealand.
 1874 - Carleton, H. The Life of Henry Williams, [Vol. I.]
 1874 - Kennaway, L. J. Crusts: A Settler's Fare due South. [Capper reprint, 1970]
 1875 - Carter, C. R. Life and Recollections of a New Zealand Colonist. Vol. III. [NZ sections only]
 1875 - Mundy, D. L. Rotomahana and the Boiling Springs of New Zealand: A Photographic Series of Sixteen Views.
 1876 - Davis, C. O. The Life and Times of Patuone
 1877 - Carleton, H. The Life of Henry Williams [Vol. II.]
 1877 - Firth, Josiah Clifton. Lectures on Lions in the Way and Luck.
 1877 - Pratt, W. T. Colonial Experiences
 1877 - Wakelin, R. History and Politics
 1878 - Buller, James. Forty years in New Zealand
 1878 - M'Indoe, J. A Sketch of Otago, from the Initiation of the Settlement to the Abolition of the Province
 1878 - Wells, B. The History of Taranaki
 1879 - Featon, J. The Waikato War, 1863-64
 1879 - Gudgeon, T. W. Reminiscences of the War in New Zealand
 1879 - Innes, C. L. Canterbury Sketches or Life from the Early Days
 1879 - Tucker, H. W. Memoir of the Life and Episcopate of George Augustus Selwyn [Vol.I]
 1879 - Tucker, H. W. Memoir of the Life and Episcopate of George Augustus Selwyn [Vol.II]
 1880 - Crawford, J. C. Recollections of Travel in New Zealand and Australia
 1881 - Campbell, John Logan. Poenamo
 1883 - Rusden, G. W. History of New Zealand Vol.I.
 1884 - Colenso, W. An Account of Visits to, and Crossings over, the Ruahine Mountain Range
 1884 - Cox, A. Recollections
 1884 - Lady Martin. Our Maoris
 1885 - Dilke, C. W. Greater Britain: A Record of Travel in English-Speaking Countries. 8th ed.
 1885 - Gudgeon, T. W. The History and Doings of the Maoris: From the Year 1820 to the Signing of the Treaty of Waitangi in 1840.
 1885 - White, John. Maori Customs and Superstitions [Lectures from 1861]
 1886 - Burrows, R. Extracts from a Diary kept by the Rev. R. Burrows during Heke's War...
 1887 - Gudgeon, T. W. The Defenders of New Zealand
 1887 - McDonnell, T. A Maori History of the War
 1887 - McDonnell, T. Incidents of the War. Tales of Maori Character and Customs
 1887 - Mackay, J. Our Dealings with Maori lands
 1887 - Pyke, V. History of the Early Gold Discoveries in Otago
 1888 - Pompallier, J. Early History of the Catholic Church in Oceania
 1888 - Barlow, P. W. Kaipara
 1888 - Colenso, William. Fifty Years Ago in New Zealand
 1888 - Moser, T. Mahoe Leaves
 1888 - Te Paerata, H. Description of the Battle of Orakau
 1889 - Wilson, J. A. Missionary Life and Work in New Zealand
 1890 - Colenso, W. The Authentic and Genuine History of the Signing of the Treaty of Waitangi [Capper reprint]
 1890? - McDonnell, Thomas. General Chute's campaign on the West Coast.
 1891 - Crozet, Julien Marie. Crozet's Voyage to Tasmania, New Zealand...[trans. H. Ling Roth]
 1893 - Fergusson, Dugald. Bush Life in Australia and New Zealand. [Chapters 28-46].
 1893 - MacKenzie, F. W. Overland from Auckland to Wellington in 1853
 1895 - Wohlers, J. F. H. Memories of the Life of J.F.H. Wohlers
 1899 - Grace, M. A Sketch of the New Zealand War
 1900 - Arnold, Thomas. Passages in a Wandering Life [Chapters 3 and 4]
 1902 - Hadfield, O. Maoris of By-gone Days
 1903 - Clarke, George. Notes on Early Life in New Zealand
 1904 - Campbell, R. Reminiscences of a Long Life in Scotland, New Zealand
 1904 - Malcolm, E. M. My Own Story: An Episode in the Life of a New Zealand Settler of 50 Years Back.
 1907 - Wilson, J. A. The Story of Te Waharoa...Sketches of Ancient Maori Life and History
 1908 - McNab, R. Historical Records of New Zealand, Volume I
 1908 - Webster, John. Reminiscences of an Old Settler in Australia and New Zealand [Selected chapters]
 1909? - Blake, A. H. Sixty Years in New Zealand
 1912 - Berry, A. Reminiscences of Alexander Berry
 1913 - Nihoniho, T. Narrative of the Fighting on the East Coast
 1914 - Harper, H W. Letters from New Zealand [Letters I-IX only, 1857-1869]
 1914 - McNab, R. Historical Records of New Zealand, Vol. II.
 1927 - Butler, John. Earliest New Zealand: the Journals and Correspondence of the Rev. John Butler
 1925 - Morton, H. B. Recollections of Early New Zealand
 1927 - Saunders, A. Tales of a Pioneer
 1928 - Grace, T. S. A Pioneer Missionary among the Maoris 1850-1879
 1928 - McRae, A. Journal kept in New Zealand in 1820
 1932 - Elder, J. (Ed.) The Letters and Journals of Samuel Marsden
 1932 - Williams, W. L. East Coast N.Z. Historical Records
 1934 - Elder, J. Marsden's Lieutenants
 1935 - Stack, J. W. Early Maoriland Adventures of J. W. Stack
 1936 - Stack, J. W. More Maoriland Adventures of J. W. Stack
 1938 - Stack, J. W. and E. Further Maoriland Adventures of J. W. and E. Stack
 1940 - Mathew, Felton. The Founding of New Zealand: The Journals of Felton Mathew, First Surveyor-General of New Zealand, and his Wife, 1840-1847.
 1961 - Selwyn, Sarah H. Reminiscences, 1809-1867.
 1961 - The Richmond-Atkinson Papers Vol I
 1961 - The Richmond-Atkinson Papers Vol II
 1961 - Williams, H. The Early Journals of Henry Williams
 1963 - Markham, Edward. New Zealand or Recollections of it
 1974 - Williams, W. The Turanga Journals

References

External links
 Official ENZB website
 b-engine website

University of Auckland
New Zealand digital libraries